Chen Tingru was a Chinese veteran. In the 2015 China Victory Day Parade, he was well known for sitting in the first row of the veteran formation as the most senior veteran.

Chen was born in Lianshui, Jiangsu. He graduated from a normal school and became the principal of a primary school. However, his students scattered since the county was captured by the Japanese Army; he had to quit. Affected by the local guerrillas, Chen determined to join them in 1939. Based in the northern part of Jiangsu province, he began to peddle propaganda against the invaders. He joined the Communist Party of China in 1942.

Later, Chen was promoted to be a middle-ranking officer who was in charge of administrative and political work. He retired in 1981. He was invited as the surviving soldier to parade on Victory Day, in 2015.

Chen died on April 27, 2017 in Suzhou, Jiangsu.

References 

Chinese centenarians
Educators from Huai'an
Men centenarians
1914 births
2017 deaths